Tomblaine is a commune in the Meurthe-et-Moselle department in north-eastern France.  Stage 7 of the Tour de France on 7 July 2012 started in Tomblaine. The Stade Marcel Picot, football stadium to Ligue 1 side AS Nancy, is located within the area.

Geography

Tomblaine is located north-east of France, in the eastern suburbs of Nancy. The town is separated from the city of Nancy by the river Meurthe. The two cities are connected by two main bridges. It is bordered to the north by the municipalities of Saint-Max and Essey-lès-Nancy to the south by Jarville-la-Malgrange, Laneuveville-devant-Nancy, Art-sur-Meurthe and Saulxures-lès-Nancy.

Climate

History

The history of the site Tomblaine dates back to at least 500 BC in Gallo-Roman times. In the seventeenth century, wars and famines spread across Tomblaine. This resulted in a large decrease in population which has since risen. In 1770, the castle within the town belonged to Prince Louis XVI, the future King of France. The commune was destroyed by the Nazis in 1944. However, reconstructions have taken place, returning the town to its former glory.

Population

Sports

Football is the preferred sport within Tomblaine. The commune pays host to the professional football club, AS Nancy, who currently reside at the Stade Marcel Picot.

Sister cities

Tomblaine has one sister city to date.

Telgte (Germany)

See also
Communes of the Meurthe-et-Moselle department
Parc naturel régional de Lorraine

References

External links

Communes of Meurthe-et-Moselle
Meurthe-et-Moselle communes articles needing translation from French Wikipedia